Events from the year 1804 in Ireland.

Events
 
14 January – Richard Lovell Edgeworth's semaphore line between Dublin and Galway is operational, but is out of use by the end of the year.
11 February – the last armed rebel group of the Society of United Irishmen, led by James Corcoran, is betrayed and killed or captured by yeomen near Enniscorthy.
4–5 March – Castle Hill convict rebellion in New South Wales led by Irish convicts in Australia.
April – first boat passes through the Grand Canal throughout between the River Liffey in Dublin and the River Shannon.
14 May – Cork Street Fever Hospital, Dublin, opens in Cork Street, Dublin.
First Martello Tower erected in Ireland, at Sutton, Dublin.

Births
Early February – James Bronterre O'Brien, Chartist leader, reformer and journalist (died 1864).
4 April – Andrew Nicholl, painter (died 1886).
7 April – James Emerson Tennent, politician and traveller (died 1869).
18 November – John George, politician, judge and in 1859 Solicitor-General for Ireland (died 1871).
25 December – Frederic Trench, 2nd Baron Ashtown, peer (died 1880).
26 December – Sir Joseph Napier, 1st Baronet, Conservative Party MP and Lord Chancellor of Ireland (died 1882).
31 December – Francis Sylvester Mahony, humorist and poet (a.k.a. Father Prout) (died 1866).

Deaths
February – James Corcoran, rebel leader (born c.1770).
27 July – Robert Clements, 1st Earl of Leitrim, politician (born 1732).

References

 
Years of the 19th century in Ireland
1800s in Ireland
Ireland
 Ireland